Sam Gilman (February 5, 1915 – December 3, 1985) was an American film and television actor. He was perhaps best known for playing Harvey Johnson in the 1961 film One-Eyed Jacks.

Life and career 
Gilman was born in Salem, Massachusetts. He worked as a cartoonist on comic books for the comic book packager Funnies Inc., from the 1930s to the 1940s. He began his acting career in 1950, appearing in the film The Men. Later, Gilman guest-starred in television programs, including Gunsmoke, Tales of Wells Fargo, 77 Sunset Strip, Alfred Hitchcock Presents, The Big Valley, Route 66, Star Trek: The Original Series, Ben Casey, Mannix, The Life and Legend of Wyatt Earp, The Fugitive, The Guns of Will Sonnett, Outlaws, The Waltons, The Untouchables and Have Gun, Will Travel.

Gilman co-starred and appeared in films, including Sometimes a Great Notion, PT 109, The Shadow on the Window, Away All Boats, The Missouri Breaks, One-Eyed Jacks (first western film credit), Wild Rovers, The Last Hard Men, Full of Life and Macon County Line. In 1966, he joined the cast of the new ABC western television series Shane, playing bartender Sam Grafton. Gilman worked as an acting coach, helping actors with performing. His final film credit was from the 1982 film National Lampoon's Movie Madness. He was also a long-time close friend of actor Marlon Brando.

Death 
Gilman died on December 3, 1985, in North Hollywood, California, at the age of 70.

References

External links 

Rotten Tomatoes profile

1915 births
1985 deaths
People from Salem, Massachusetts
Male actors from Massachusetts
American male film actors
American male television actors
20th-century American male actors
Western (genre) television actors
American cartoonists